Manzanita is a studio album by Mia Doi Todd. It was released on Plug Research on February 8, 2005.

Reception
At Metacritic, which assigns a weighted average score out of 100 to reviews from mainstream critics, Manzanita received an average score of 71% based on 12 reviews, indicating "generally favorable reviews".

Track listing

References

External links

2005 albums
Mia Doi Todd albums
Plug Research albums